Dennis Madden (20 March 1913 – death unknown) was a Welsh rugby union and professional rugby league footballer who played in the 1930s.

Background
Dennis Madden was born in Aberavon, Wales.

Playing career

International honours
Dennis Madden won 7 caps for Wales in 1935–1939 while at Acton and Willesden, Huddersfield, and Leeds.

County Cup Final appearances
Dennis Madden played right-, i.e. number 3, and scored a try and a goal in Huddersfield's 18–10 victory over Hull F.C. in the 1938 Yorkshire County Cup Final during the 1938–39 season at Odsal Stadium, Bradford on Saturday 22 October 1938.

References

External links
Search for "Dennis Madden" at britishnewspaperarchive.co.uk
Search for "Denis Madden" at britishnewspaperarchive.co.uk

1913 births
Aberavon RFC players
Acton and Willesden RLFC players
Huddersfield Giants players
Leeds Rhinos players
Place of death missing
Rugby league centres
Rugby league players from Aberavon
Rugby union players from Aberavon
Wales national rugby league team players
Welsh rugby league players
Welsh rugby union players
Year of death missing